And Their Refinement of the Decline is the seventh and most recent studio album by Stars of the Lid, which was released by Kranky in April 2007. The album was Kranky's 100th release, and was issued as a double CD and as a triple vinyl LP set (featuring alternate artwork). And Their Refinement of the Decline features minimal, droning compositions of varied length created from treated guitar, horn, piano, and other classical instruments.

The track "Dopamine Clouds Over Craven Cottage" refers to Craven Cottage in London, the home stadium of English football club, Fulham F.C. At the time of the album's release, their captain was  ex-United States soccer international Brian McBride, who shares the same name as Brian McBride from Stars of the Lid. The track "Don't Bother They're Here" uses the melody of Stephen Sondheim's 1973 song  "Send in the Clowns".

In December 2007, American webzine Somewhere Cold ranked And Their Refinement of the Decline No. 5 on their 2007 Somewhere Cold Awards Hall of Fame.

Track listing

Disc one
 "Dungtitled (in A major)" – 5:54
 "Articulate Silences Part 1" – 5:24
 "Articulate Silences Part 2" – 5:37
 "The Evil That Never Arrived" – 5:05
 "Apreludes (in C sharp major)" – 3:44
 "Don't Bother They're Here" – 10:10
 "Dopamine Clouds Over Craven Cottage" – 5:55
 "Even If You're Never Awake (Deuxième)" – 9:20
 "Even (Out) +" – 4:51
 "A Meaningful Moment Through a Meaning(less) Process" – 4:32

Disc two
 "Another Ballad for Heavy Lids" – 4:32
 "The Daughters of Quiet Minds" – 13:21
 "Hiberner Toujours" – 1:49
 "That Finger on Your Temple Is the Barrel of My Raygun" – 5:04
 "Humectez La Mouture" – 5:31
 "Tippy's Demise" – 8:18
 "The Mouthchew" – 3:40
 "December Hunting for Vegetarian Fuckface" – 17:45

Credits
Composed and recorded in Brussels, Belgium and Los Angeles, California by Adam Wiltzie and Brian McBride.

Additional instrumentation
Sarah Nelson – cello
Alexander Waterman – cello
Jeff Rizzy – cello
Borris Gronemberg – trumpet
Cedric Manche – flugelhorn
Toine Thys – clarinet
Daniel Noesig – trumpet
Jesse Sparhawk – harp
Saint-Jean-Baptiste au Béguinage Children's Choir – choir

Contributors
Luke Savisky
Craig McCaffrey
Pieter DeWagter
Mr. Kranky

References

2007 albums
Stars of the Lid albums
Kranky albums